Malta was ruled by the Order of Saint John as a vassal state of the Kingdom of Sicily from 1530 to 1798. The islands of Malta and Gozo, as well as the city of Tripoli in modern Libya, were granted to the Order by Spanish Emperor Charles V in 1530, following the loss of Rhodes. The Ottoman Empire managed to capture Tripoli from the Order in 1551, but an attempt to take Malta in 1565 failed.

The Maltese navy was small but competent and was constantly involved in naval warfare since its inception. Their greatest achievement came during the Great Siege of Malta of 1565. Their independence (and fleet) lasted until 12 June 1798, when Napoleon Bonaparte, during his campaign against the Ottoman Empire, captured Malta with little bloodshed, along with the entire remaining Maltese navy. All remaining Maltese ships were added to the French Navy. Some of these ships were later captured by the Royal Navy when they recaptured Malta in 1800, bringing an end to the history of the Maltese navy.

Ship list 

Malta